The Maryland Terrapins baseball team was a baseball team that represented the University of Maryland, College Park in the 2021 NCAA Division I baseball season. The Terrapins were members of the Big Ten Conference and played their home games at Bob "Turtle" Smith Stadium in College Park, Maryland. They were led by fourth-year head coach Rob Vaughn.

Previous season
The Terrapins finished the 2020 NCAA Division I baseball season 10–5 overall (0–0 conference) and first place in conference standings, as the season was cut short in stages by March 12 due to the COVID-19 pandemic.

Preseason
For the 2021 Big Ten Conference poll, Maryland was voted to finish in fifth by the Big Ten Coaches.

Roster

Schedule

! style="" | Regular Season
|- valign="top" 

|- bgcolor="#ffcccc"
| 1 || March 5 || vs  || Fluor Field at the West End • Greenville, South Carolina || 0–6 || Benschoter (1–0) || Burke (0–1) || None || 328 || 0–1 || 0–1
|- bgcolor="#ffcccc"
| 2 || March 6 || vs Michigan State || Fluor Field at the West End • Greenville, South Carolina || 4–7 || Erla (1–0) || Fisher (0–1) || Iverson (1) || 313 || 0–2 || 0–2
|- bgcolor="#ffcccc"
| 3 || March 6 || vs Michigan State || Fluor Field at the West End • Greenville, South Carolina || 4–5 || Christophersen (1–0) || Bello (0–1) || Iverson (2) || 313 || 0–3 || 0–3
|- bgcolor="#ccffcc"
| 4 || March 7 || vs Michigan State || Fluor Field at the West End • Greenville, South Carolina || 3–2 || Savacool (1–0) || Powers (0–1) || None || 307 || 1–3 || 1–3
|- bgcolor="#ccffcc"
| 5 || March 12 || at  || Bainton Field • Piscataway, New Jersey || 13–8 || Burke (1–1) || Rutkowski (1–1) || None || 250 || 2–3 || 2–3
|- bgcolor="#ffcccc"
| 6 || March 13 || at Rutgers || Bainton Field • Piscataway, New Jersey || 3–9 || Wereski (2–0) || Fisher (0–2) || Muller (1) || 250 || 2–4 || 2–4
|- bgcolor="#ffcccc"
| 7 || March 13 || at Rutgers || Bainton Field • Piscataway, New Jersey || 7–8 || Stanavich (1–0) || Staine (0–1) || Fitzpatrick (2) || 250 || 2–5 || 2–5
|- bgcolor="#ccffcc"
| 8 || March 14 || at Rutgers || Bainton Field • Piscataway, New Jersey || 9–5 || Savacool (2–0) || Hoopes (0–2) || None || 250 || 3–5 || 3–5
|- bgcolor="#ccffcc"
| 9 || March 20 || at  || Medlar Field • University Park, Pennsylvania || 19–10 || Blohm (1–0) || Gagnon (0–1) || Bello (1) || 302 || 4–5 || 4–5
|- bgcolor="#ffcccc"
| 10 || March 21 || at Penn State || Medlar Field • University Park, Pennsylvania || 5–6 || Shingledecker (1–1) || Zoellner (0–1) || None || 282 || 4–6 || 4–6
|- bgcolor="#ccffcc"
| 11 || March 22 || at Penn State || Medlar Field • University Park, Pennsylvania || 7–1 || Savacool (3–0) || Virbitsky (0–2) || None || 205 || 5–6 || 5–6
|- bgcolor="#ffcccc"
| 12 || March 27 || vs Iowa || Bill Davis Stadium • Columbus, Ohio || 4–6 || Hoffman (1–0) || Ramsey (0–1) || Nedved (4) || – || 5–7 || 5–7
|- bgcolor="#ffcccc"
| 13 || March 28 || vs Iowa || Bill Davis Stadium • Columbus, Ohio || 2–11 || Davitt (2–1) || Staine (0–2) || None || – || 5–8 || 5–8
|- bgcolor="#ffcccc"
| 14 || March 28 || at Ohio State || Bill Davis Stadium • Columbus, Ohio || 4–5 || Root (3–1) || Fisher (0–3) || Brock (4) || 180 || 5–9 || 5–9
|- bgcolor="#ccffcc"
| 15 || March 29 || at Ohio State || Bill Davis Stadium • Columbus, Ohio || 9–3 || Savacool (4–0) || Pfenning (0–2) || Ramsey (1) || 107 || 6–9 || 6–9
|-

|- bgcolor="#ccffcc"
| 16 || April 2 || Northwestern || Bob "Turtle" Smith Stadium • College Park, Maryland || 4–3 || Falco (1–0) || Smith (1–1) || Bello (2) || 150 || 7–9 || 7–9
|- bgcolor="#ccffcc"
| 17 || April 3 || Northwestern || Bob "Turtle" Smith Stadium • College Park, Maryland || 8–4 || Ramsey (1–1) || Moe (0–1) || None || 150 || 8–9 || 8–9
|- bgcolor="#ffcccc"
| 18 || April 4 || No. 25 Michigan || Bob "Turtle" Smith Stadium • College Park, Maryland || 5–6 || Weiss (3–1) || Falco (1–1) || None || 150 || 8–10 || 8–10
|- bgcolor="#ccffcc"
| 19 || April 5 || No. 25 Michigan || Bob "Turtle" Smith Stadium • College Park, Maryland || 17–7 || Blohm (2–0) || Paige (0–1) || Bello (3) || 100 || 9–10 || 9–10
|- bgcolor="#ffcccc"
| 20 || April 9 || at Nebraska || Haymarket Park • Lincoln, Nebraska || 2–6 || Povich (3–1) || Burke (1–2) || None || 2361 || 9–11 || 9–11
|- bgcolor="#ccffcc"
| 21 || April 10 || at Nebraska || Haymarket Park • Lincoln, Nebraska || 10–7 || Ramsey (2–1) || Bragg (1–2) || Bello (4) || 3197 || 10–11 || 10–11
|- bgcolor="#ffcccc"
| 22 || April 11 || at Nebraska || Haymarket Park • Lincoln, Nebraska || 3–14 || Schanaman (3–0) || Savacool (4–1) || None || 3188 || 10–12 || 10–12
|- bgcolor="#ccffcc"
| 23 || April 16 || Ohio State || Bob "Turtle" Smith Stadium • College Park, Maryland || 10–6 || Burke (2–2) || Burhenn (2–2) || None || 100 || 11–12 || 11–12
|- bgcolor="#ccffcc"
| 24 || April 17 || Ohio State || Bob "Turtle" Smith Stadium • College Park, Maryland || 5–4 || Falco (2–1) || Brock (0–1) || None || 10 || 12–12 || 12–12
|- bgcolor="#ccffcc"
| 25 || April 18 || Ohio State || Bob "Turtle" Smith Stadium • College Park, Maryland || 9–4 || Savacool (5–1) || Neely (1–2) || None || 100 || 13–12 || 13–12
|- bgcolor="#ffcccc"
| 26 || April 23 || at Iowa || Duane Banks Field • Iowa City, Iowa || 2–6 || Hoffman (3–0) || Burke (2–3) || Nedved (6) || 528 || 13–13 || 13–13
|- bgcolor="#ccffcc"
| 27 || April 24 || at Iowa || Duane Banks Field • Iowa City, Iowa || 8–6 || Dean (1–0) || Irvine (2–3) || Bello (5) || 1,112 || 14–13 || 14–13
|- bgcolor="#ccffcc"
| 28 || April 24 || vs Northwestern || Duane Banks Field • Iowa City, Iowa || 2–1 || Ott (1–0) || Doherty (1–2) || Falco (1) || – || 15–13 || 15–13
|- bgcolor="#ccffcc"
| 29 || April 25 || vs Northwestern || Duane Banks Field • Iowa City, Iowa || 9–7 || Fisher (1–3) || Uberstine (2–3) || None || – || 16–13 || 16–13
|- bgcolor="#ccffcc"
| 30 || April 30 ||  || Bob "Turtle" Smith Stadium • College Park, Maryland || 12–4 || Dean (2–0) || Schoeberl (0–4) || None || 100 || 17–13 || 17–13
|-

|- bgcolor="#ccffcc"
| 31 || May 1 || Minnesota || Bob "Turtle" Smith Stadium • College Park, Maryland || 4–3 || Fisher (2–3) || DeLuga (0–1) || None || 250 || 18–13 || 18–13
|- bgcolor="#ccffcc"
| 32 || May 2 || Minnesota || Bob "Turtle" Smith Stadium • College Park, Maryland || 6–3 || Falco (3–1) || Skoro (2–3) || Bello (6) || 250 || 19–13 || 19–13
|- bgcolor="#ffcccc"
| 33 || May 7 || at  || Illinois Field • Champaign, Illinois || 0–2 || Hoffmann (2–0) || Dean (2–1) || Kirschsieper (2) || 158 || 19–14 || 19–14
|- bgcolor="#ccffcc"
| 34 || May 8 || at Illinois || Illinois Field • Champaign, Illinois || 5–3 || Savacool (6–1) || Lavender (5–2) || Bello (7) || 141 || 20–14 || 20–14
|- bgcolor="#ccffcc"
| 35 || May 9 || at Illinois || Illinois Field • Champaign, Illinois || 12–4 || Ramsey (3–1) || Gowens (1–3) || None || 167 || 21–14 || 21–14
|- bgcolor="#ccffcc"
| 36 || May 14 || Purdue || Bob "Turtle" Smith Stadium • College Park, Maryland || 11–0 || Dean (3–1) || Schapira (0–6) || None || 150 || 22–14 || 22–14
|- bgcolor="#ccffcc"
| 37 || May 15 || Purdue || Bob "Turtle" Smith Stadium • College Park, Maryland || 6–1 || Savacool (7–1) || Johnson (2–5) || Ramsey (2) || 250 || 23–14 || 23–14
|- bgcolor="#ccffcc"
| 38 || May 16 || Purdue || Bob "Turtle" Smith Stadium • College Park, Maryland || 7–2 || Burke (3–3) || Brooks (2–3) || Zoellner (1) || 250 || 24–14 || 24–14
|- align="center" bgcolor="#ccffcc"
| 39 || May 21 || at No. 24 Michigan || Ray Fisher Stadium • Ann Arbor, Michigan || 11–8 || Ramsey (4–1) || Proctor (0–1) || None || 250 || 25–14 || 25–14
|- align="center" bgcolor="#ffcccc"
| 40 || May 22 || at No. 24 Michigan || Ray Fisher Stadium • Ann Arbor, Michigan || 3–14 || Weston (6–3) || Savacool (7–2) || Dragani (1) || 250 || 25–15 || 25–15
|- align="center" bgcolor="#ccffcc"
| 41 || May 23 || at No. 24 Michigan || Ray Fisher Stadium • Ann Arbor, Michigan || 7–3 || Burke (4–3) || Denner (4–4) || None || 250 || 26–15 || 26–15
|- align="center" bgcolor="#ccffcc"
| 42 || May 29 || Indiana || Bob "Turtle" Smith Stadium • College Park, Maryland || 4–3 || Ramsey (5–1) || Macciocchi (0–1) || None || 250 || 27–15 || 27–15
|- align="center" bgcolor="#ccffcc"
| 43 || May 29 || Indiana || Bob "Turtle" Smith Stadium • College Park, Maryland || 5–2 || Burke (5–3) || Brown (5–4) || None || 250 || 28–15 || 28–15
|- align="center" bgcolor="#ffcccc"
| 44 || May 30 || Indiana || Bob "Turtle" Smith Stadium • College Park, Maryland || 3–7 || Stahl (3–0) || Blohm (2–1) || None || 500 || 28–16 || 28–16
|-

|-
! style="" | Postseason
|- valign="top" 

|- bgcolor="#ffcccc"
| 45 || June 4 || vs Charlotte || Clark–LeClair Stadium • Greenville, North Carolina || 10–13 || Marozas (5–3) || Savacool (7–3) || Giesting (1) || 4,174 || 28–17 || 28–16
|- bgcolor="#ccffcc"
| 46 || June 5 || vs Norfolk State || Clark–LeClair Stadium • Greenville, North Carolina || 16–0 || Burke (6–3) || Hosley (7–2) || Thompson (1) || 4,196 || 29–17 || 28–16
|- bgcolor="#ccffcc"
| 47 || June 6 || vs Charlotte || Clark–LeClair Stadium • Greenville, North Carolina || 2–1 || Zoellner (1–1) || Lindsey (6–2) || None || 5,017 || 30–17 || 28–16
|- bgcolor="#ffcccc"
| 48 || June 6 || vs East Carolina || Clark–LeClair Stadium • Greenville, North Carolina || 6–9 || Colmore (7–1) || Staine' (0–3) || Bridges (5) || 5,017  || 30–18 || 28–16
|-

Awards

Big Ten Conference Players of the Week

Conference awards

References

Maryland
Maryland Terrapins baseball seasons
Maryland
Maryland